Qarah Tappeh (also Romanized as Qareh Tappeh; also known as Kara-Tappeg and Qaratepe) is a village in Howmeh Rural District, in the Central District of Abhar County, Zanjan Province, Iran. At the time of the 2006 census, its population was 23, in 7 families.

References 

Populated places in Abhar County